The Tripoli Monument is the oldest military monument in the United States. It honors heroes of the United States Navy from the First Barbary War (1801–1805): Master Commandant Richard Somers, Lieutenant James Caldwell, James Decatur (brother of Capt.Stephen Decatur), Henry Wadsworth, Joseph Israel, and John Sword Dorsey. It was carved in Livorno, Italy in 1806 and brought to the United States on board the famous 1797 frigate  ("Old Ironsides"). From its original installation in the Washington Navy Yard at the new national capital of Washington, D.C. in 1808, it was later moved to the west front terrace of the United States Capitol facing the National Mall in 1831, and finally to the United States Naval Academy campus in Annapolis, Maryland in 1860.

Description

The monument is made of Carrara marble with a sandstone base and measures . It is also known as the U. S. Naval Monument, the Naval Monument, and the Peace Monument.  The designer was Giovanni Charles Micali (sometimes Giovanni Carlo Micali), who signed his work as Giov. Charles Micali Invento·In Livorno 1806.

Inscriptions
On the north side of the monument's base is Micali's signature as described above. On the west side of the monument's base is inscribed:

On the east side of the monument's base:

On the south side of the monument's base:

On each face of the larger bottom base is inscribed:

Near the monument is a brass historical plaque placed there after a restoration undertaken in 2000. The first two paragraphs of the plaque are

History of the monument

At the conclusion of the First Barbary War (1801–1805), Captain David Porter, USN assumed the task of creating a suitable monument for the fallen officers. Working with the Bishop of Florence, Porter commissioned Micali to produce the piece for $3000, half of Micali's usual fee. Vandalized and damaged by the occupying British at the burning of Washington in August 1814, during the War of 1812, the monument was later restored. In 1831, it was moved to the United States Capitol on the west front facing the National Mall, much to the dissatisfaction of Porter, who found it had "been placed in a small circular pond of dirty fresh water—not large enough for a duck puddle—to represent the Mediterranean Sea."

Resolution came in 1860 when the monument was moved to the campus of the U.S. Naval Academy at Annapolis, Maryland. Even there, as the Academy expanded, the monument was moved and relocated several times around campus, before finally being situated in front the Academy's Officers' and Faculty Club.

In August 1994, the Smithsonian American Art Museum noted that the Tripoli Monument needed treatment. The needed restoration of the monument was completed in June 2000. There is some conjecture that the figures of Glory, History, Commerce, and Fame are not in Micali's original positions.  The adjustment may have occurred in the transition to the Capitol in 1831.

References

External links

Monuments and memorials in Maryland
1806 sculptures
Buildings
Vandalized works of art in Maryland
1808 establishments in Maryland